Shaun Bailey may refer to:
Shaun Bailey (London politician) (born 1971), a member of the London Assembly and former Conservative candidate for Mayor of London
Shaun Bailey (West Bromwich MP) (born 1992), Conservative Member of Parliament for West Bromwich West
Shaun Bailey (cricketer) (born 1990), player for Northamptonshire

See also
Sean Bailey (disambiguation)